Peter Lima is a Samoan former professional rugby league footballer who played in the 1990s and 2000s, representing Samoa at the 2000 World Cup.

Playing career
Lima played for the Auckland side in the 1993 National Provincial Competition, and also made the Junior Kiwis. Lima also played for Western Samoa at the 1993 World Sevens.

Lima played two matches for the Gold Coast Chargers in 1996. He played for the Burleigh Bears in the 1998 Queensland Cup.

In 2000 Lima was selected for the Samoan squad for the World Cup, and played in two matches for his country.

References

Living people
Samoan rugby league players
Samoa national rugby league team players
Gold Coast Chargers players
Auckland rugby league team players
Rugby league wingers
Rugby league centres
Waitakere rugby league team players
Burleigh Bears players
Junior Kiwis players
Samoan emigrants to New Zealand
Samoan expatriate rugby league players
Expatriate rugby league players in Australia
Samoan expatriate sportspeople in Australia
Year of birth missing (living people)